Sport in Qatar is primarily centred on football in terms of participation and spectators. Additionally,  athletics, basketball, handball, volleyball, camel racing, horse racing, cricket and swimming are also widely practised. There are currently eleven multi-sports clubs in the country, and seven single-sports clubs.

The largest sporting event hosted in Qatar was the 2006 Asian Games, hosted in Doha. There were 46 disciplines from 39 events contested. On 2 December 2010, Qatar won the rights to host the 2022 FIFA World Cup, thus becoming the first Arab nation to host the tournament.

Two weeks after stripping San Diego as the host of the first World Beach Games, the Association of National Olympic Committees on 14 June 2019 gave Qatar the honour to host the event. ANOC said "Qatar boasts spectacular oceanfront locations and is ready to provide the perfect setting." The 2019 World Beach Games were held from October 12 to 16.

Football

Football is by far the most popular sport in Qatar, and is played and supported by locals and expatriates alike. The country has two tiers of domestic professional football leagues. The top tier, known as the Qatar Stars League, has undergone numerous expansions in the last several years. In 2009, the league expanded from ten to twelve clubs, and again expanded by two clubs in May 2013, bringing the total number of teams in the first division to fourteen. Attendance at QSL matches ranges between 2,000 and 10,000, depending on the popularity of the teams. In a 2014 survey conducted by Qatari government ministries and departments, 65% of the 1,079 respondents indicated that they did not attend a football match in the previous league season.

Al Sadd is the most successful sports club in the country, and have won the continental club competition on two occasions. Former Real Madrid and Spain striker Raul Gonzalez played for Al Sadd between 2012 and 2014, and in July 2015 the club announced the signing of former FC Barcelona and Spain playmaker Xavi. In May 2019, Xavi was appointed the head coach of the club following his retirement at the end of the 2018–19 season.

Other famous footballers to play in Qatar include: Pep Guardiola, Gabriel Batistuta, Fernando Hierro, and Ronald de Boer.

The Qatari national football team's greatest footballing accolade has been winning the Gulf Cup three times, first in 1992, and again in 2004 and 2015. The youth team also reached the final of the 1981 FIFA World Youth Championship, where they lost 4–0 to West Germany in the final.

Qatar hosted the AFC Asian Cup in 1988 and 2011. It has also hosted the Gulf Cup three times, winning the cup twice.

Qatar won the 2019 AFC Asian Cup on February 1, 2019, after defeating Japan by 3–1 in the finals at Abu Dhabi.

In June 2019, FIFA awarded Qatar the rights to host the 2019 FIFA Club World Cup and 2020 FIFA Club World Cup. On 21 December 2019, Qatar concluded the FIFA Club World Cup, which was being looked at as a benchmark for the 2022 FIFA World Cup. However, the tournament was announced one of the most successful editions in history by the Secretary-General of the Supreme Committee for Delivery & Legacy (SC) Hassan al-Thawadi.

2022 FIFA World Cup

On 2 December 2010, Qatar won their bid to host the 2022 FIFA World Cup. Beating rival bids from Australia, the United States, South Korea, and Japan, FIFA stated that the Qatari bid ran on a platform of bringing the World Cup to the only part of the world previously excluded from hosting it, donating parts of stadia to under-developed countries in Africa and Asia after the competition finishes, and giving fans the opportunity to watch multiple matches in one day and reduce travel expenses by being the most compact tournament to date.

The local organising committee, the Supreme Committee for Development and Legacy, is planning to build nine new stadiums and expand three existing stadiums for this event. The first stadium to be completed will be the Khalifa International Stadium, due in 2016. Qatar's winning bid for the 2022 World Cup was greeted enthusiastically in the Arab world as it was the first time a country in the Middle East or North Africa had been selected to host the tournament.

The tournament is expected to generate thousands of jobs, with extensive infrastructure required to prepare the country to host the world's biggest sports games. Official Qatari sources have estimated that the country will spend US$138 billion, which will include new motorways, a new deep water port, a metro system as well as nine stadia and an extensive fan zone.

As of summer 2015, major contracts have been awarded to a number of international companies, including Foster and Partners, WS Atkins, Arup Associates, and Pascall+Watson.

In addition to the awarding of contracts to international companies, the Supreme Committee announced its intention to support entrepreneurs and small and medium-sized enterprises in the region through the Challenge 22 competition. Held for the first time in June 2015, the competition requires anyone inhabiting a GCC country to submit a business plan. Finalists are invited to Doha for two days of intense coaching, before pitching to judges and winning cash and incubation prizes.

To deliver these projects on time the economy and population are expected to double between 2014 and 2022, with the total number of inhabitants due to exceed four million. The need for new housing has given a boost to the construction and real estate sectors, with growth expected to be  9.5 percent according to the Qatar Statistics Authority.

The emblem for the 2022 FIFA World Cup was revealed in Doha on September 3, 2019. Since the 2022 FIFA would be the first to be played in winters, the emblem depicts a woollen shawl and is inspired by the Arab culture.

Ahead of the World Cup, the United States Men's National Soccer Team (USMNT) announced to hold a training camp in Doha in January 2020. Players like Gyasi Zardes, Jordan Morris, Sebastian Lletget and Aaron Long have been invited to join the camp at Qatar's Aspire Academy.

In October 2021, David Beckham signed a $277 million (£150m) deal with Qatar. Beckham signed a ten-year deal with Qatar to be the face of the Qatar World Cup in 2022.

Controversies

Shortly after the awarding of the World Cup to Qatar, the bid was embroiled in controversy, including allegations of bribery. European football associations have also objected to the 2022 World Cup being held in Qatar for a variety of reasons, including the impact of high temperatures on players' fitness, to the disruption it might cause in European domestic league calendars should the event be rescheduled to take place during winter. In March 2015, FIFA and Qatar agreed that the competition would be held in November and December 2022.

Qatar authorities have also sought to improve the situation by commissioning British law firm DLA Piper to undertake a review of conditions in 2012. Following the recommendations made, Qatar Foundation created the Migrant Workers Welfare Charter which apply minimum requirements with respect to the recruitment, living and working conditions, as well as the general treatment of workers engaged in construction and other projects. The mandatory standards will be incorporated into agreements between Qatar Foundation and all its contractors, who are required to comply with the requirements and rules. Contractors and sub-contractors found to be violating the regulations have been blacklisted from future tenders.

Labour rights have slowly been improving since the review; for example, in August 2015, Qatar announced it will launch a new electronic salary system to guarantee safe and punctual payments directly into workers' bank accounts. Companies that fail to pay their workers on time will be fined and the country maintains that prison sentences could even be handed out. Government ministers also predict that changes to the country's kafala system will be announced later in 2015.

On 31 March 2016, Amnesty International reported that Qatar exposed for its forced labour & abuses against migrant workers. This report is  based on 132 migrant construction workers. According to the report there were many issues like, congested and small accommodations, not being paid for several months, kafala sponsorship system and many others. In October 2019, Qatari authorities have taken a significant step towards protecting migrant workers. According to the reports the reforms include minimum thresholds for wage, food and accommodation, totaling QR 1,800. In addition, a Minimum Wage Commission was established to monitor its impact. Between September 2020 and March 2022, over 300,000 workers (including 7,000 domestic workers) changed their jobs. The Worker’s Support and Insurance Fund, established in 2019, has disbursed QAR 358,000,000 (nearly USD 100m) to over 35,000 workers, in March 2022. A non-discriminatory minimum wage came into force in March 2021, and 280,000 workers or 13% of the workforce received wage rise. The number of complaints at the online platform was nearly 25,000 in 2021, compared to 11,000 in the previous year. In March 2022, 228 workers’ representatives were elected to represent almost 40,000 employees in 37 enterprises.

On 15 September 2022, a global survey was conducted by Amnesty International which showed 73% of people support the proposal that FIFA should use some money generated by the 2022 world cup to compensate migrant workers and other 67% want their national football associations to speak out publicly about the human rights issues associated with the 2022 Qatar world cup including in support of compensation for migrant workers. 

Amid the argument, FIFA issued a statement in which FIFA elucidates that it has taken into account the global survey on labor standards conducted by Amnesty International and shed light on how people are not fully aware of the measures implemented in recent years by FIFA and its partners in Qatar to protect workers involved in the delivery of the FIFA world cup Qatar 2022. International labour organization (ILO) and international unions recognized the wide range of measures that have been implemented over the past years to improve protection for workers in Qatar and these developments have come about largely as a consequence of the world cup being played in the country.

Motor racing

Qatar Racing Club, a drag racing facility where the Arabian Drag Racing League competes, is located in the country's capital Doha on a 150,000 m2 area. Its racing track has a capacity for 2,000 people.

Khalid bin Hamad Al Thani, the first Qatari to drive a Formula One car, is involved in the sport and is the owner of Al-Annabi Racing.

Qatari athlete Nasser Al-Attiyah has won 2011, 2015 and 2019 Dakar Rally, the 2008, 2015, 2016 and 2017 FIA Cross Country Rally World Cup, the 2006 Production World Rally Championship, and the 2014 and 2015 World Rally Championship-2.

The Losail International Circuit has hosted the Qatar motorcycle Grand Prix since 2004, a Superbike World Championship round from 2005 to 2009 and since 2014, a Motocross World Championship round since 2013 and hosted its first ever Formula One grand prix on November 21, 2021, with Lewis Hamilton taking the inaugural victory.

Powerboat racing
The Grand Prix of Qatar, a round in the Formula 1 Powerboat World Championship, was held annually in Doha Bay from 2005 to 2015. In addition, the state-sponsored Qatar Team won four Formula 1 championships with Jay Price (2008) and Alex Carella (2011–2013). Qatar ended their involvement in Formula 1 powerboat racing in early 2015 with the merger of the Qatar Sailing Federation and Qatar Marine Sports Federation (QMSF).

Since November 2009, Qatar has been host of the Oryx Cup World Championship, a hydroplane boat race in the H1 Unlimited season. The races take place in Doha Bay.

Basketball

Basketball is an increasingly popular sport in Qatar. The sport is administered by the Qatar Basketball Federation (QBF).  The QBF was established in 1964, but was only admitted into the FIBA Asia and the Organizing Committee of the GCC in 1979.

Qatar's first basketball championship came in the 1995 GCC Youth Championship. The national basketball team won back-to-back bronze medals in the 2003 and 2005 editions of the Asian Basketball Championship and qualified for the 2006 FIBA World Championship. Qatar is also bidding for hosting rights for the 2023 FIBA World Championship.

Club teams compete in the Qatari Basketball League, the top domestic basketball league in the country. Qatar's first women's basketball league was launched in 2012.

Beach volleyball
Qatar featured a men's national team in beach volleyball that competed at the 2018–2020 AVC Beach Volleyball Continental Cup.

Camel racing
Historically camel racing was a tradition among the Bedouin tribes of Qatar and would be performed on special occasions such as weddings. It was not until 1972, one year after Qatar's independence, that camel racing was practiced on a professional level. Typically, camel racing season takes place from September to March. Approximately 22,000 racing camels are used in competitions which are mainly held at the country's primary camel racing venue, the Al-Shahaniya Camel Racetrack. The average distance of such races is usually 4 to 8 km depending on the conditions of the camels being raced.

Cricket
Cricket is the second most popular sport of Qatar, albeit one that the local citizens play very little. Despite that, workers and residents from the Indian Subcontinent love to play the game that is treated near to a religion back in their home territories, and because the subcontinent accounts for nearly half the residents in Qatar, the game is rapidly picking up its pace. Although the local Qatar national team isn't as popular, cricket tournaments such as the ICC World Cup and the ICC World Twenty20 which exclude Qatar but include nations which account for most of the expatriates in the country are one of the most viewed sporting events in the country.

The Qatar Cricket Association (QCA) is set to host the country's first T10 League by the end of 2019.

Falconry

Falconry is widely practiced by Qataris. The only falconry association is Al Gannas, which was founded in 2008 in the Katara Cultural Village district of Doha, and which hosts the Annual Falconry Festival. There are roughly 3,000 people in Qatar who own falcons. Hunting season extends from October to April. Prices of falcons can be extremely high, being as expensive as QR 1 million.

Futsal
Futsal became an officially sanctioned sport in 2007, when the fully professional Qatar Futsal League was established. There are two futsal tournaments; the QFA Futsal Cup and the Open Cup, which was inaugurated in 2010. Futsal is overseen by a department of the Qatar Football Association. A women's league was launched in 2009 under the auspices of the Women's Sports Committee.

Golf
Qatar has hosted the Commercial Bank Qatar Masters, a European Tour golf event, since 1998.

Handball
Handball is a very popular team sport in Qatar. It was introduced to the country in 1968; however, Qatar did not join the International Handball Federation until the 1970s. The Qatar men's national handball team qualified for the IHF World Men's Handball Championship on four occasions, and automatically qualified for a fifth as host. Qatar came runners-up to France in the 2015 World Handball Championship held on home soil, however the tournament was marred by various controversies.

Qatar has won the Asian Men's Handball Championship title four times in a row in 2014, 2016, 2018 and 2020.

Table Tennis
In  October 2021, Sultan Khalid Al Kuwari won U-13 World table tennis tournament with 3-2 victory over compatriot Rawad Al Nasser at Sultan Qaboos Sports Complex in Muscat, Oman.

Sport by number of athletes registered

Statistics accurate as of 2013.

Major sport events in Qatar

Annual Events
 since 1993 - Qatar ExxonMobil Open
 since 1998 - Commercial Bank Qatar Masters
 since 2004 - FIM Moto Racing World Championships
 since 2008 - FEI Equestrian Global Champions Tour
 since 2008 - WTA Tour Tennis Championships
 since 2010 - IAAF Diamond League
 since 2010 - IHF Handball Super Globe
 since 2010 - FIVB Club World Championships

Failed Bids
 2020 - Olympic Games

See also
 Khalifa International Stadium
 Qatar at the Olympics

References